Momo and Uzeir was a Yugoslav comedy duo made up of Bosniak Rejhan Demirdžić (2 January 1927 – 22 August 1988) and Serbian-born Rudolf "Rudi" Alvađ (17 July 1929 – 21 September 1988). The characters of Momo and Uzeir were created by Nikola Škrba (1922–1995). Their radio comedy show Cik Cak aired on Radio Sarajevo and was popular all over Yugoslavia.

Rejhan Demirdžić
Demirdžić first began acting in 1943, aged 16, in the play The Mistress of the Inn at the Sarajevo National Theatre. From 1945 to 1955 he was a member of theater ensembles in Šabac, Niš and Užice, before returning to the Sarajevo National Theatre. In 1969 Demirdžić starred in Karađoz (Black-eyed), a sketch comedy television show that he co-wrote with Jurislav Korenić (1915–1974). It aired on Televizija Sarajevo until 1971.

Rudi Alvađ
Alvađ was born in Petrovac na Mlavi. He was a theatre actor that worked in Pula and Varaždin before moving to Sarajevo.

Legacy
The twin skyscrapers of the Sarajevo United Investment and Trading Company, built in 1986, were unofficially named after the duo.

References

1988 deaths
People from Sarajevo
Bosniaks of Bosnia and Herzegovina
Bosnia and Herzegovina Muslims
Bosnia and Herzegovina comedy duos
Bosnia and Herzegovina comedians
Bosnia and Herzegovina actors
Bosnia and Herzegovina people of Serbian descent
20th-century comedians
Radio characters introduced in 1922
Comedy radio characters
Male characters in radio